The 2008 Bord Gáis Energy GAA Hurling All-Ireland Under-21 Championship was the 45th staging of Ireland's hurling knock-out competition for players aged between 18 and 21. Kilkenny won the championship, beating Tipperary 2-13 to 0-15 in the final at Croke Park, Dublin.

Results

Leinster Under-21 Hurling Championship

Quarter-finals

Semi-finals

Final

Munster Under-21 Hurling Championship

Quarter-final

Semi-finals

 

Final

Ulster Under-21 Hurling Championship

Table

Group stage

All-Ireland Under-21 Hurling Championship

Semi-finals

 

Final

External links
 Full list of results for the 2008 championship

Under-21
All-Ireland Under-21 Hurling Championship